Clubs in the Campeonato Nacional de Fútbol: 

 FC Ciudad de La Habana
 FC Isla de La Juventud
 FC La Habana
 FC Pinar del Río
 FC Cienfuegos
 FC Industriales
 FC Matanzas
 FC Villa Clara
 FC Camagüey
 FC Ciego de Ávila
 FC Las Tunas
 FC Sancti Spíritus
 CF Granma
 FC Guantánamo
 FC Holguín
 FC Santiago de Cuba
 FC Mayabeque
Real Matanzas

Cuba
 
Football Clubs
Football clubs